The genus Thymus (thymes) contains about 350
species of aromatic perennial herbaceous plants and subshrubs to 40 cm tall in the family Lamiaceae, native to temperate regions in Europe, North Africa and Asia.

Stems tend to be narrow or even wiry; leaves are evergreen in most species, arranged in opposite pairs, oval, entire, and small, 4–20 mm long, and usually aromatic. Thyme flowers are in dense terminal heads with an uneven calyx, with the upper lip three-lobed, and are yellow, white, or purple.

Several members of the genus are cultivated as culinary herbs or ornamentals, when they are also called thyme after its best-known species, Thymus vulgaris or common thyme.

Thymus species are used as food plants by the larvae of some Lepidoptera (butterfly and moth) insect species, including Chionodes distinctella and the Coleophora case-bearers C. lixella, C. niveicostella, C. serpylletorum, and C. struella (the latter three feed exclusively on Thymus).

Classification
A considerable amount of confusion has existed in the naming of thymes. Many nurseries use common names rather than binomial names, which can lead to mix-ups. For example golden thyme, lemon thyme, and creeping thyme are all common names for more than one cultivar. Some confusion remains over the naming and taxonomy of some species, and Margaret Easter (who holds the NCCPG National Plant Collection of thymes in the UK) has compiled a list of synonyms for cultivated species and cultivars.

The most common classification is that used by Jalas, in eight sections:  
 
Micantes: Iberian Peninsula and north Africa, includes T. caespititius
Mastichina: Iberian Peninsula, includes T. mastichina
Piperella: Monotypic section confined to the vicinity of Valencia, Spain
Teucrioides: Balkan Peninsula
Pseudothymbra: Iberian Peninsula and north Africa, includes T. cephalotos, T. longiflorus and T. membranaceus
Thymus: Western Mediterranean region, includes T. camphoratus, T. carnosus, T. hyemalis, T. vulgaris and T. zygis
Hyphodromi: Throughout the Mediterranean region, includes T. cilicicus and T. comptus
Serpyllum: The largest section, throughout whole region, apart from Madeira and Azores, includes T. comosus, T. doerfleri, T. herba-barona, T. longicaulis, T. pannonicus, T. praecox, T. pulegioides, T. quinquecostatus, T. richardii, T. serpyllum, T. sibthorpii and T. thracicus

Selected species

Thymus adamovicii
Thymus altaicus
Thymus amurensis
Thymus boissieri
Thymus bracteosus
Thymus broussonetii
Thymus caespititius
Thymus camphoratus
Thymus capitatus
Thymus capitellatus
Thymus camphoratus
Thymus carnosus
Thymus cephalotus
Thymus cherlerioides
Thymus ciliatus
Thymus cilicicus
Thymus cimicinus
Thymus citriodorus (Thymus × citriodorus) syn. T. fragrantissimus, T. serpyllum citratus, T. serpyllum citriodorum. – citrus thyme
Thymus comosus
Thymus comptus
Thymus curtus
Thymus decussatus
Thymus disjunctus
Thymus doerfleri
Thymus dubjanskyi
Thymus glabrescens
Thymus herba-barona
Thymus hirsutus
Thymus hyemalis
Thymus inaequalis
Thymus integer
Thymus lanuginosus, syn. T. serpyllum – woolly thyme
Thymus leucospermus
Thymus leucotrichus
Thymus longicaulis
Thymus longiflorus
Thymus mandschuricus
Thymus marschallianus
Thymus mastichina
Thymus membranaceus
Thymus mongolicus
Thymus moroderi
Thymus nervulosus
Thymus nummularis
Thymus odoratissimus
Thymus pallasianus
Thymus pallidus
Thymus pannonicus
Thymus praecox – creeping thyme
Thymus proximus
Thymus pseudolanuginosus, syn. T. serpyllum – woolly thyme
Thymus pulegioides – lemon thyme 
Thymus quinquecostatus
Thymus richardii
Thymus satureioides
Thymus serpyllum
Thymus sibthorpii
Thymus striatus
Thymus thracicus – lavender thyme
Thymus villosus
Thymus vulgaris – common thyme
Thymus zygis

References

Sources
Easter M. Thymus
University of Melbourne: Thymus

External links
World Checklist

 
Lamiaceae genera
Subshrubs
Taxa named by Carl Linnaeus